Thornburgh is a surname. Notable people with the surname include:

David Thornburgh (born 1958), American chief executive
Dick Thornburgh (1932–2020), American politician, governor of Pennsylvania (1979–1987) and U.S. Attorney General (1988–1991)
Elaine Thornburgh, American musician
George Thornburgh (1847–1923), American politician
Jacob Montgomery Thornburgh (1837–1890), American politician
Ron Thornburgh (born 1962), American politician, Secretary of State of Kansas since 1994
Thomas Tipton Thornburgh (1843–1879), American military officer killed during the Battle of Milk Creek

See also
Thornburgh v. American College of Obstetricians & Gynecologists, a 1986 United States Supreme Court case
Thornburgh House, also called Thornburgh, Richmond Hill, Queensland, Australia, a historic house
Thornburg College, original name of Blackheath and Thornburgh College, Richmond Hill, Queensland
Thornburg (disambiguation), including a list of people with the surname